Giulia Ghiretti (born 16 February 1994) is an Italian para-swimmer. At the 2016 Summer Paralympics in Rio she won a bronze medal in the 50m Butterfly S5, and a silver in the 100m Breaststroke SB4. She also won the silver medal at the 2020 Summer Paralympics, in 100 metre breaststroke SB4.

Biography 
Ghiretti was born in Parma. She was originally a trampolinist until a training accident in January 2010 which caused her spinal injury. In 2011 she began swimming, and made her international competitive debut at the 2013 IPC Swimming World Championships in Montreal.

Grimaldi an athlete of the Gruppo Sportivo Fiamme Oro.

Achievements

References

External links 
 
  

1994 births
Living people
Italian female breaststroke swimmers
Italian female butterfly swimmers
Italian female freestyle swimmers
Italian female medley swimmers
Paralympic swimmers of Italy
Paralympic silver medalists for Italy
Paralympic bronze medalists for Italy
Swimmers at the 2016 Summer Paralympics
Swimmers at the 2020 Summer Paralympics
Medalists at the 2016 Summer Paralympics
Medalists at the 2020 Summer Paralympics
Medalists at the World Para Swimming Championships
S4-classified Paralympic swimmers
S5-classified Paralympic swimmers
Swimmers of Fiamme Oro
Paralympic athletes of Fiamme Oro
Paralympic medalists in swimming
Sportspeople from Parma
People with paraplegia